The 1997 World Archery Championships was the 39th edition of the event. It was held in Victoria, Canada on 19–23 August 1997 and was organized by World Archery Federation (FITA).

Medals table

Medals summary

Recurve

Compound

References

External links
 World Archery website
 Complete results

World Championship
World Archery
International archery competitions hosted by Canada
World Archery Championships
1997 in British Columbia